The Itsay is a right tributary of the Naryn in Jalal-Abad Region, Kyrgyzstan. Its source is in the  range, western Tian Shan mountains. It discharges into the Naryn southwest of Kara-Köl.

References

Rivers of Kyrgyzstan